Lac d'Espingo is a lake in Haute-Garonne, Pyrénées, France. At an elevation of 1882 m, its surface area is 0.076 km².

Espingo